Akhisar Şehir Stadium is a stadium in Akhisar, Turkey. The stadium has a capacity of 5,000 seats. Since 1970 it was the stadium of Akhisarspor, but the stadium finally closed in 2012.

Football venues in Turkey
Buildings and structures in Manisa Province
Akhisarspor